You Had It Coming is the eighth studio album by guitarist Jeff Beck, released in December 2000 through Epic Records. The album reached No. 17 and 110 on the Billboard Top Internet Albums and Billboard 200 charts respectively, as well as No. 96 and 123 on the German and French albums chart. "Dirty Mind", went on to win the award for Best Rock Instrumental Performance at the 2002 Grammys; this being Beck's third such award, after the albums Flash (1985) and Jeff Beck's Guitar Shop (1989). Singer Imogen Heap is featured on "Dirty Mind" and "Rollin' and Tumblin'", and would later tour with Beck in 2004.

Track listing

Personnel
Jeff Beck – guitar
Jennifer Batten – guitar
Imogen Heap – vocals (tracks 3, 4)
Aidan Love – programming
Steve Alexander – drums
Randy Hope-Taylor – bass
Technical
Matt Tait – engineering
Kevin Metcalfe – mastering
Andy Wright – production

Chart performance

Awards

References

External links
In Review: Jeff Beck "You Had It Coming" at Guitar Nine Records

Jeff Beck albums
2000 albums
Epic Records albums
Grammy Award for Best Rock Instrumental Performance